William Foulis may refer to:

Sir William Foulis, 4th Baronet (1659–1741), of the Foulis baronets
Sir William Foulis, 5th Baronet (c. 1680–1756), of the Foulis baronets
Sir William Foulis, 6th Baronet (1729–1780), of the Foulis baronets
Sir William Foulis, 7th Baronet (1759–1802), of the Foulis baronets
Sir William Foulis, 8th Baronet (1790–1845), of the Foulis baronets
Sir William Liston-Foulis, 8th Baronet (1812–1858), of the Foulis baronets
Sir William Liston-Foulis, 10th Baronet (1869–1918), of the Foulis baronets

See also
William Munro, 12th Baron of Foulis (died 1505), Scottish Knight and Scottish clan chief of the highland Clan Munro
Foulis (surname)
William Foulis (Keeper of the Privy Seal), a 15th-century Scottish political figure